Giovanna Tosato (born ) is an Italian–American physician-scientist and cancer researcher investigating the endothelium, angiogenesis, and the hematopoietic stem cell niche. She heads the molecular and cell biology section in the laboratory of cellular oncology at the National Cancer Institute in the United States. Tosato was a division director in the Center for Biologics Evaluation and Research from 1992 to 1999.

Education 
Tosato was born . She earned an M.D. at the Sapienza University of Rome in 1973. She completed a residency at the Catholic University in Rome. In 1976, she moved to the National Cancer Institute (NCI) in the United States where she became a clinical associate in the pediatric and medicine branches and subsequently a visiting fellow in the metabolism branch. In 1982, work performed by Tosato, Alfred Steinberg, and Michael Blaese showed an association between a particular viral infection and rheumatoid arthritis.

Career and research 
In 1983, Tosato began working at the United States Food and Drug Administration (FDA). From 1992 to 1999 she served as director of the Center for Biologics Evaluation and Research's division of hematologic products, center for biologics evaluation and research. In 1999, Tosato returned to the NCI as a senior investigator. As of 2021, she heads the molecular and cell biology section in the laboratory of cellular oncology at the National Cancer Institute.

Tosato's laboratory focuses on the study of the endothelium in the context of cancer development and progression. She studies angiogenesis and vessel survival as these processes are essential for tumor growth. Her laboratory investigates the endothelium as a component of the hematopoietic cell niche. This research is used to develop targeted therapies for cancer and other conditions in which the endothelium plays a functional role.

Personal life 
At the age of 64, Tosato completed the 2013 Boston Marathon in 3 hours and 57 minutes. She was between 50 to 100 yards past the finish line when the Boston Marathon bombing started.

Selected works

References 

Living people
Year of birth missing (living people)
20th-century births
20th-century Italian scientists
21st-century Italian scientists
20th-century Italian physicians
21st-century Italian physicians
20th-century biologists
21st-century biologists
Italian medical researchers
Cancer researchers
Women medical researchers
Sapienza University of Rome alumni
National Institutes of Health people
Food and Drug Administration people
Italian emigrants to the United States
20th-century women physicians
21st-century women physicians
Italian molecular biologists
Women molecular biologists
Cell biologists